The 1953 Richmond Spiders football team was an American football team that represented the University of Richmond as a member of the Southern Conference (SoCon) during the 1953 college football season. In their third season under head coach Ed Merrick, Richmond compiled a 5–3–1 record, with a mark of 3–3 in conference play, finishing tied for fifth place in the SoCon.

Schedule

References

Richmond
Richmond Spiders football seasons
Richmond Spiders football